Atelopus muisca is an extinct species of toad in the family Bufonidae.
It is endemic to Colombia.
Its natural habitats were subtropical or tropical moist montane forests, subtropical or tropical high-altitude grassland, and rivers.
It is threatened by habitat loss.

Etymology and habitat 

See also 

List of flora and fauna named after the Muisca

References 

muisca
Amphibians of Colombia
Amphibians of the Andes
Endemic fauna of Colombia
Altiplano Cundiboyacense
Muisca
Amphibians described in 1992
Taxonomy articles created by Polbot